Viral B Shah is an Indian computer scientist, best known for being a co-creator of the Julia programming language. He was also actively involved in the initial design of the Aadhaar project in India which provides a 12-digit unique identity number to each Indian resident based on their biometric and demographic data. Based on his experiences implementing Aadhaar and other complex technology projects in government, he co-authored the book Rebooting India with Nandan Nilekani.

Dr. Shah is currently the CEO of JuliaHub (former company name Julia Computing), which he co-founded as Julia Computing with Julia co-creators, Jeff Bezanson, Alan Edelman, Stefan Karpinski as well as Keno Fischer and Deepak Vinchhi. In July 2021, Julia Computing raised $24 Million in Series A round led by Dorilton Ventures, with participation from Menlo Ventures, General Catalyst, and HighSage Ventures.

Awards
 In 2013, Dr. Shah received The Spatial Ecology and Telemetry Working Group (SETWG) award for co-creating Circuitscape with Brad McRae.
 In 2019, Dr. Shah was awarded the J. H. Wilkinson Prize for Numerical Software with Jeff Bezanson and Stefan Karpinski for their work on the Julia programming language.

References

Living people
Indian computer scientists
Year of birth missing (living people)